Ángel David Rodríguez Contreras (born February 21, 1985, in Mexico City) is a former professional Mexican footballer.

References

1985 births
Living people
Mexican footballers
Ascenso MX players
Footballers from Mexico City
Association footballers not categorized by position
21st-century Mexican people